Siproeta epaphus, the rusty-tipped page or brown siproeta, is a New World butterfly that lives all year in tropical habitats. It has large wings, averaging , that are black in the inner portion of the top surface and brown throughout the underside. Both surfaces have a bold white transverse stripe continuing across both wings. The outer portion of the forewings, beyond the white stripe, is rusty orange in the widespread subspecies S. epaphus epaphus; it is mostly or entirely black in the other two subspecies. S. epaphus is found throughout Central America, where it is one of the most common butterflies. Its range extends from southern North America to central South America. The range includes (though may not be limited to) south Texas and rarely southern New Mexico south through both eastern and western Mexico to the Guyanas, Brazil, Bolivia and Peru.

Subspecies 
There are three recognized subspecies:
 S. epaphus epaphus (widespread)
 S. epaphus gadoui (described from Venezuela)
 S. epaphus trayja (described from Brazil, Paraguay)

References

External links

Rusty-tipped Page Butterflies and Moths of North America
Rusty-tipped Page, Learn about Butterflies

epaphus
Butterflies described in 1813
Butterflies of Central America
Butterflies of North America
Fauna of Brazil
Nymphalidae of South America
Taxa named by Pierre André Latreille